James Earl Wright (born December 31, 1991) is a former American football wide receiver. He was drafted by the Cincinnati Bengals in the seventh round of the 2014 NFL Draft. He played college football at LSU.

Professional career

Cincinnati Bengals
Wright was drafted by the Cincinnati Bengals in the seventh round (239th overall) of the 2014 NFL draft.

On October 12, 2014, Wright recorded his first career reception, in overtime against the Carolina Panthers, good for 24 yards and setting up a would-be game-winning field goal by the Bengals. However, the attempt was missed by Mike Nugent, ending the game in a 37-37 tie.

On November 30, 2014, Wright had a career-best 3 receptions for 59 yards, including a 30-yard reception late in the fourth quarter which helped the Bengals to a 14-13 victory over the Tampa Bay Buccaneers. However, on the same play, Wright tore his PCL and missed the rest of 2014 and all of 2015 seasons on Injured Reserve.

On August 1, 2016, Wright was activated off of the Physically Unable to Perform (PUP) list.

On March 13, 2017, Wright was released by the Bengals.

Cleveland Browns
On March 14, 2017, Wright was claimed off waivers by the Cleveland Browns. He was waived/injured by the Browns on August 5, 2017 and placed on injured reserve. He was released on August 30, 2017.

Indianapolis Colts
On January 2, 2018, Wright signed a reserve/future contract with the Indianapolis Colts. He was waived/injured on September 1, 2018 and was placed on injured reserve. He was released on April 30, 2019.

References

External links
LSU Tigers bio
Cincinnati Bengals bio

1991 births
Living people
American football wide receivers
Cincinnati Bengals players
Cleveland Browns players
Indianapolis Colts players
LSU Tigers football players
People from Belle Chasse, Louisiana
Players of American football from Louisiana
Ed Block Courage Award recipients